This is a list of gravity hills and magnetic hills around the world.

A gravity hill is a place where a slight downhill slope appears to be an uphill slope due to the layout of the surrounding land, creating the optical illusion that water flows uphill or that a car left out of gear will roll uphill. Many of these sites have no specific name and are often called just "Gravity Hill", "Magnetic Hill", "Magic Road" or something similar.

Argentina
Buenos Aires Province: El camino misterioso, just outside Tandil. coordinates: 
Chubut: On ruta provincial 12, connecting Gualjaina to Esquel. coordinates: 
Jujuy: Locality Las Lajitas, on ruta provincial 56, between La Mendieta and Carahunco. coordinates:

Armenia
Aragatsotn Province: On the road to Lake Kari, on Mount Aragats.coordinates:

Australia

Bowen Mountain, New South Wales: Bowen Mountain Road, shortly after turnoff from Grose Vale Road. Known as Magnetic Mountain. Hill starts at intersection of Bowen Mountain Road and Westbury Roadcoordinates: 
Forrestfield, Western Australia: Holmes Road, There is a right hand bend about 300 metres north of Whistlepipe Ct, then a gradual left hand bend. The location is between these two bends.coordinates: 
Moonbi, New South Wales, near Tamworth: "Gravity Hill" near the Moonbi lookoutcoordinates: 
Orroroo, South Australia: Magnetic Hill, on the road from Black Rock to Pekinacoordinates: 
Woodend, Hanging Rock, Victoria: Straws Lanecoordinates: 
Brisbane, Queensland: Spook Hill, on Mount View Road.coordinates:

Barbados
Gravity hill at Morgan Lewis, Saint Andrew.coordinates:

Belize
"Magnetic Hill" on the Hummingbird Highway.coordinates:

Brazil

Mato Grosso: On the MT-251 road between Cuiaba and Chapada Dos Guimarães.coordinates: 
Belo Horizonte, Minas Gerais: Rua Professor Otávio Coelho de Magalhães (official name), popularly known as Rua do Amendoim (Portuguese for "Peanut Street"). coordinates: 
São Thomé das Letras, Minas Gerais: Ladeira do Amendoim. coordinates: 
Paraíba: On the BR-110, near Teixeira.coordinates: 
Exu, Pernambuco: "Ladeira da Gameleira" on the BR-122 federal highway segment connecting Exu to Crato.coordinates: 
Rio de Janeiro: Locality of Belvedere, near Petrópolis.coordinates: 
Rio Grande do Norte: On the BR-226 federal highway segment between Jucurutu and Florâniacoordinates: 
Santa Catarina: On the SC-110, between Bom Retiro and Urubici.  coordinates:

Canada

Abbotsford, British Columbia: McKee Road just before Ledgeview Golf Course
Whonnock, Maple Ridge, British Columbia: Just south of 100th Avenue on 256th Street.coordinates: 
Vernon, British Columbia: 5390 Dixon Dam Road.coordinates: 
Benito, Manitoba: "Magnet Hill". Heading west after leaving P.R. No. 487 towards the Thunder Hill Ski Area, an apparent dip in the road provides the illusion.coordinates: 
Moncton, New Brunswick: Magnetic Hill. One of the best known such spots worldwide.coordinates: 
Burlington, Ontario: King Road, just north of Bayview Park. Stop car at "No Motorized Vehicles" sign, face south.coordinates: 
Caledon, Ontario: Escarpment Sideroad just off Highway 10, at Escarpment’s intersection with the street leading to Devil’s Pulpit Golf Course.coordinates: 
Dacre, Ontario: near the intersection of Highway 41, near intersection with Highway 132, known as Magnetic Hillcoordinates: 
Sparta, Ontario: "Magnetic hill", on Centennial Road.  coordinates: 
Oshawa, Ontario: Ritson Road N (north of Raglan Road).coordinates: 
Chartierville, Quebec: Magnetic Hill.coordinates: 
Notre-Dame-Auxiliatrice-de-Buckland, Quebec: Route Saint-Louis (Côte magnétique de Buckland)coordinates:

Chile
Arica y Parinacota Region, Arica Province: Zona magnética, on ruta 11 (the Arica-Putre road). coordinates: 
Easter Island (Rapa Nui, Isla de Pascua), Valparaíso Region: Punto magnético, near Anakena beach. coordinates:

China
Liaoning: The Strange Slope (or Magic Slope): an 80 m long slope in Guaipo Resort, about 30 km to the north-east of the city of Shenyang. coordinates: 
Liaoning: a  slope near Liujia Wopeng Village, Huludao City.

Costa Rica
Alajuela Province: La cuesta magnética, on the Bijagua-Upala road. coordinates:

Cyprus
Paphos: Just after Droushia exit to Polis main road.coordinates:

Czech Republic
Close to the village of Kačerov near Zdobnice.coordinates: 
On the road leading from Moravská Třebová to the village of Hřebeč, at the point where it branches off from route 35. coordinates:

Denmark
Bornholm: Magnetbakken. coordinates:

Dominican Republic
Polo: El Polo Magnético ("The Magnetic Pole")coordinates:

El Salvador
Sonsonate Department: On the CA 8W (Ruta de las flores), in Salcoatitan.coordinates:

France
Curiosité de Lauriole, Hérault, on a small road linking the D56 to the hamlet "Les Fournes", between Minerve and Siran, through Fauzan.coordinates: 
Route magique des Noës, Loire department, Auvergne-Rhône-Alpes Region: Starting from Renaison go in the direction of Les Noës, continue for about 1 km to the hamlet "Les Forges", and then turn left.coordinates: 
La montée qui descend, Côte-d'Or Department, Bourgogne-Franche-Comté Region, near the village of Savigny-lès-Beaune.coordinates: 
Rhône department, Auvergne-Rhône-Alpes Region, on the D43 road between La Poyebade and Odenas.coordinates:

Germany
On the L3053 between Butzbach and .coordinates: 
Essen-Werden, North Rhine-Westphalia: On the three-way intersection of Klemensborn and Pastoratsberg roads, on the road part leading to the DJH Youth Hostel, starting just across the road from the public bus stop. coordinates:

Greece
Karya-Leptokarya road near Leivithra, mount Olympus, Pieria, Central Macedonia.coordinates: 
Proti village (altitude 310 m) - Analipseos ("Ascension") Monastery (altitude 930 m) road, mount Pangaion, Serres, Central Macedonia. The spot where the effect starts is marked by signs painted on the road surface. This is a most convincing site: for a distance of about 40 meters, the uphill-going road changes inclination to become very slightly downhill, before it becomes uphill again. Within this stretch of the road, the car will move slowly (which adds to the spookiness of the situation) on its own, and then it will come to a halt. What makes the site more striking than others is that the general direction of the spontaneous movement is clearly towards the higher ground, that is, towards the ascending slope of the mountain and the monastery.coordinates: 
Just after the exit of a small tunnel, near Veroia, Imathia regional unit, Central Macedonia. Caution is advised, as, due to possible traffic exiting the tunnel, this is a somewhat risky spot to stop the car at, in order to experience the effect. coordinates: 
Penteli-Agios Petros-Nea Makri road, mount Penteli, North Athens.coordinates: 
On the Kalamata-Areopoli provincial road, Messinia regional unit, Peloponnisos.coordinates:

Guatemala
Sololá Department: Paso Misterioso, on ruta nacional 11, just outside the town of Santa Cruz Quixayá, in the direction of San Lucas Tolimán.coordinates:

India

 Chhattisgarh state: 
 Surguja district - Ulta Pani magnetic hill: also called Bisar paani magnetic hill, is located at Mainpat hill station 70 km south of Ambikapur city.coordinates: 
 Chhattisgarh state: 
 Kabirdham district - Dewanpatpar magnetic hill: is 40 km north of Pandariya on State Highway SH5 in Kabirdham district (formerly Kawardha district).coordinates: 
 Gujarat state:
 Amreli district - Tulsishyam Anti Gravity Hill: 400 meters north of Tulsi Shyam Temple and 75 km south of Amreli city. coordinates: 
 Kutch district - Kalo Dungar magnetic hill: has a gravity hill optical illusion 5.2 km west of the Kutch Dattaterya Temple and 33 km northwest of Kutch city.
 Ladakh union territory: 
 Leh district - Leh-Manali Magnetic Hill: is located 7.5 km southwest of Nimmoo on Leh on Manali-Leh highway.coordinates: 
 Maharashtra state: 
 Mumbai - Magnetic L&T flyover: it is an optical illusion on the Jogeshwari–Vikhroli Link Road (JVLR).coordinates:

Indonesia
Kelud mountain, Kediri Regency, East Java.coordinates: 
Limpakuwus, Banyumas Regency, Central Java.coordinates: 
Aceh Besar Regency, Sumatra.coordinates:

Iraq
Koy Sanjaq: On the drive toward Hotel Koya Palace.coordinates:

Ireland
County Louth: Cooley Peninsula, Jenkinstown, east of Dundalk, known locally as Magic Hill.coordinates: 
 County Sligo: Ballintrillickcoordinates: 
County Tipperary: Slievenamon, overlooking Carrick-on-Suir and near Clonmel
County Waterford: Comeragh Mountains, on the road to the Mahon Fallscoordinates:

Isle of Man
Between Ronague and the Round Table, called Magnetic Hill.coordinates:

Israel
Near Amuka, Northern District.coordinates: 
Jabel Mukaber, Jerusalem: The Enchanted Road.

Italy
Campania: Stradina Magica: a very small and narrow side road in Sala Consilina, Salerno province.coordinates: 
Rome (Lazio): between Ariccia and Rocca di Papa on the strada regionale 218, called "Ariccia's downhill".coordinates: 

Piedmont (Piemonte): Salita di Roccabruna, on the three-way intersection of strada provinciale 122 with the road leading to Sant' Anna. The road to the left appears as downhill although it is uphill.coordinates: 
Trentino: The "mirage" slope in Montagnaga, again on a three-way intersection.coordinates: 
Abruzzo: Village of Rosciolo dei Marsi near Avezzano, on the road leading to the church of Santa Maria in Valle Porclaneta.coordinates: 
Apulia (Puglia): On a small side road beside strada statale 172, between Taranto and Martina Franca.coordinates: 
Apulia (Puglia): On strada provinciale 39 between Corato and Poggiorsini.coordinates: 
Sicily (Sicilia): Near the town of Santa Maria di Licodia, north of Paternò.coordinates: 
Tuscany (Toscana): Between Filattiera and Caprio.coordinates: 
Umbria: On the San Gemini Nord exit from strada statale 3 bis.coordinates:

Japan
Shikoku: Yashima Drive Way on Mt. Yashima, Takamatsu.coordinates: 
A three-way intersection near Tōwa, Iwate Prefecture, where both roads are downhill but the right one appears as uphill.coordinates: 
A three-way intersection near the town of Minamitane, Tanegashima island, Kagoshima prefecture.coordinates: 
"Ghost slope" in Kume-Jima, Okinawa Prefecture.coordinates: 
"Ghost slope" in Okagaki, Fukuoka Prefecture.

Jordan
 Οn the road between Mount Nebo and the Dead Sea.coordinates:

Kenya 
 Machakos County: Kituluni Hill, also known as Kyamwilu, 12 kilometres from Machakos town along the Machakos-Kangundo road.coordinates:

Lebanon
Road near Hamat.coordinates:

Libya
 Jafara district, near the town of Gharyan.

Lithuania 
 Auxiliary road to Kruonis Pumped Storage Plantcoordinates:

Malaysia
Sabah: Kimanis–Keningau Highway, about 28 km from Keningau.coordinates:

Mexico
Baja California: On an interchange on the Tijuana-Ensenada scenic highway.coordinates: 
Colima: Zona mágica, between Comala and Suchitlán. coordinates: 
León, Guanajuato. On Cima del Sol Street, just when one enters from Campestre Boulevard.coordinates: 
Puebla: Punto Marconi, between Metepec and Atlimeyaya. coordinates: 
Veracruz: Just outside Acultzingo, on the road leading to Tehuacan.coordinates: 
Veracruz: On the Santana-Los Atlixcos-Topilito road. coordinates:

Oman
Salalah: Anti-Gravity Pointcoordinates:

Panama
Volcán, Chiriquí road connecting Volcán with Cerro Puntacoordinates:

Philippines

Ternate, Cavite, Luzon island: On the Nasugbu-Ternate highway.coordinates: 
Los Baños, Laguna, Luzon island: Mount Makiling, Jamboree road.coordinates: 
Negros Island: On the Bacolod-San Carlos road, between Murcia and Don Salvador Benedicto.coordinates:

Poland

Karpacz, a small town in the Sudetes mountains in south-western Poland, a section of Strażacka Street; the illusion is referred to as a "gravitational anomaly" (Polish: anomalia grawitacji) and is a local tourist attraction.coordinates: 
Żar Mountain (Pol. Góra Żar, also called Magiczna Góra) - a small mountain in Little Beskids in southern Poland; there is a road segment ca.  long circling the mountain where "cars roll uphill"
 The Czarodziejska Górka is a 200-meter stretch of the road between Strączno and Rutwica near Wałcz in north-west Poland where objects, including cars, roll uphill.coordinates: 
 Izersky antigravity point, near Świeradów-Zdrój, south-western Poland, marked by a stone like the one in Karpacz.coordinates:

Portugal
Braga: Three-way intersection behind Bom Jesus do Monte, where both roads are downhill but the left one (the side road) appears as uphill.coordinates: 
Viseu: On the CM1225 road ascending to Serra da Arada.coordinates:

Romania
County of Maramureș: the road between Budești and Cavnic.coordinates:

Saudi Arabia
Wadi al-Jinn (Valley of Jinns) in Madinah North East of Masjid Al-Nabawi Actual name is Wadi Al Baidah. Wadi Al Jinn (Valley of Jins) name is given by the local tour operators and tourists.coordinates:

Serbia
In the village of Ivanje on Radan Mountain near Kuršumlija.coordinates:

Slovakia 
 On the road from Lipovce to Lačnov.coordinates:

South Africa
Kwazulu-Natal: On the R74 provincial route between Greytown and Weenen.coordinates: 
Somerset West, City of Cape Town, Western Cape: Spook Hill, on Parel Vallei Road.coordinates:

South Korea
Jeju Island: Dokebi Road ("Mysterious Road")coordinates:

Spain 
 Aragón, Province of Zaragoza: Cuesta mágica del Moncayo, near San Martín de la Virgen del Moncayo.coordinates: 
 Andalusia, Province of Málaga: Cuesta de Ronda, on the A-369 road near Ronda.coordinates: 
 Valencian Community,   Province of Alicante: Cuesta mágica de Crevillente.coordinates:

Sweden 
 Idre: Trollvägen, Nipfjälletcoordinates:

Thailand 
 "Magic Hill" on the Mae Sot-Tak road (Route 12, a part of the Asian Highway 1).coordinates:

Trinidad and Tobago 
 The magnetic road: On the North Coast Road near Maracas Bay.coordinates:

Turkey 
 Erzurum: On Gizemli yol.coordinates:

United Kingdom

England
Buckinghamshire: Dancers End Lane, Aston Clinton.coordinates: 
Essex: Hangman's Hill, High Beech, Epping Forest.coordinates: 
West Sussex: Rogate, on the A272 road to the west of the village.

Northern Ireland
County Down: The Magic Hill. Mourne Mountains, on the B27 head southeast towards the Spelga Damcoordinates:

Scotland
South Ayrshire: Electric Brae, on the A719 between Dunure and Croy Braecoordinates:

Wales
Powys: Llangattock (Crickhowell), Brecon Beacons, approximately 3 miles (4.8 km) west of Llangattock.coordinates:

United States

Alabama
Gravity Hill Lane at Oak Grove (Talladega County).coordinates: 
Henry's Hill near Mount Hope (Lawrence County).coordinates:

Alaska
Anchorage: Upper Huffman Road, Hillside, Anchorage Borough.coordinates:

Arkansas
Dyer, near Alma.coordinates: 
Helena: Sulphur Springs Road.coordinates:

California
Altadena, 1054 E. Loma Alta Dr.coordinates: 
Moreno Valley, on Nason Street (while driving south, immediately after Elder St).coordinates: 
Ocotillo, on the off ramp at the exit from I-8 westbound to Mountain Springs road. coordinates: 
Rohnert Park (in Sonoma County): From U.S. Route 101 (US 101) freeway, take Rohnert Park Expressway east to Petaluma Hill Road, Petaluma Hill Road south to Roberts Road, Roberts Road east to Lichau Road. At an iron gate with the words "Gracias San Antonio" is the start of the gravity hill section (on the western slope of Sonoma Mountain near the Fairfield Osborn Preserve).coordinates: 
Santa Cruz: 465 Mystery Spot Road off Branciforte Drive near State Route 17 (SR 17) within the redwood forest. A tourist attraction called "Mystery Spot" is operated at the site.
Sylmar: On Kagel Canyon Rd.coordinates: 
Whittier: Site at cemetery in Whittier, on Workman Mill Road, near Rio Hondo College

Connecticut
Sterling: On Main Street, just before its intersection with Snake Meadow Hill Road.coordinates:

Florida

Lake Wales: Spook Hill, US 27 between Orlando and Tampacoordinates:

Georgia
Cumming: Booger Hill a.k.a. Booger Mountain
Fort Gaines: Spook Hill, north of towncoordinates:

Indiana
 Mooresville: Gravity Hill.coordinates:

Kentucky
Covington: in Devou Park.coordinates: 
Vehicles stop in the tunnel that the Western Kentucky Parkway bridge creates and the vehicle will roll all the way to the end of the road at the stop sign.coordinates:

Maryland
Burkittsville: On Gapland road (W Main Street).coordinates:

Massachusetts
Greenfield: Shelburne Road facing east towards Greenfield immediately after the Massachusetts Route 2 (Route 2) overpass.coordinates:

Michigan
Blaine Township (near Arcadia): Putney Road south of its intersection with Joyfield Road. Cars appear to roll toward the church at the intersection. Local legend claims the church is pulling sinners towards its doors for redemption.coordinates: 
Rose City: at the end of Reasner Road, past Heath Roadcoordinates: 
Farmington Hills: in Oakwood Cemetery, if you enter by the west gate and stop by a knotted tree, then put your car in neutral, it will appear to roll back uphill.

Minnesota
 330th St and 660th Ave., Watkins (Forest City Township)

Mississippi
Burnsville

Missouri
Freeman: southwest of town near the Kansas state line at the intersection of Missouri Route D (Route D) and East 299th Street. Just outside Louisburg, Kansas.coordinates:

Montana
Columbia Falls: The Montana Vortex

New Jersey
Franklin Lakes: Ewing Avenue exit off Route 208 South
Jackson: New Prospect Roadcoordinates: 
Titusville: On Pleasant Valley Road.coordinates:

New York
Yates County:  Spook Hill, on Newell Road.coordinates: 
Cattaraugus County:  On Promised Land Road, Portville.coordinates: 
Rockland County: On Spook Rock Road, at its intersection with US 202. Very convincing. coordinates:

North Carolina
Boone: Mystery Hill
Richfield: Gravity Hill on Richfield Rd.  Local legends suggest paranormal causes for phenomenon.coordinates: 
Scotland County: Gravity Hill

Ohio
Kirtland Hills: King Memorial Road coordinates:

Oklahoma
Bartlesville: Moose Lodge Road near the railway crossing.coordinates: 
Springer: Near Ardmore, on Pitt Road.coordinates:

Oregon
Gold Hill: the Oregon Vortex

Pennsylvania
Near Lewisberry, York County, on Pleasantview Road (also rendered Pleasant View Road) at its intersection with Pennsylvania Route 177 (PA 177). This is an extremely convincing site.coordinates: 
North Park, Pittsburgh: Intersection of McKinney Road and Kummer Road.coordinates: 
New Paris: Gravity Hill Road (two gravity hills in this area).coordinates: 
Near Uniontown: Laurel Caverns

South Dakota

Texas
El Paso: Thunderbird Drive facing south.coordinates: 
San Antonio: Just east of the San Antonio Missions National Historical Park at the railway crossing at Villamain Road and Shane Road.coordinates:

Utah
Salt Lake City: A few blocks northeast of the Capitol building in Salt Lake City. A small road (Bonneville Boulevard) loops around a park called Memory Grove.coordinates:

Virginia
Danville: Berry Hill Road (US 311/SR 863) and Oak Hill Road (SR 862)coordinates:

Washington
Set vehicle into neutral at the word "start" that is written across the surface of the road.coordinates:

Wisconsin
Shullsburg: Judgement Street, just after Rennick Road.coordinates: 

Wyoming
Casper: Garden Creek Road, near the entrance to Rotary Park, when going toward Casper Mountain Road.coordinates:

Uruguay
Maldonado Department: Cumbres de la Ballena.

References

 
Optical illusions